Pekina is a town and locality in the Mid North region of South Australia. The name of the town is thought to derive from the Aboriginal word for "creek water".

European settlement in the Pekina district began in earnest in 1846 when Price Maurice brought 3000 sheep to the district. The Pekina Station, "one of the most profitable sheep runs" in South Australia, became a stopping-point for coaches on the run between Blinman and Burra. In 1871, Pekina Station was resumed and broken up for closer settlement. The region was settled by German and especially Irish migrant farmers. Problems with drought, rust and locusts in the 1880s meant the town grew slowly with only around 75 residents at the beginning of the 20th century.

Pekina's Irish Roman Catholic heritage has seen the district nicknamed "Vatican Valley".

The historic former Pekina Animal Pound is listed on the South Australian Heritage Register.

References

Further reading

Towns in South Australia